Guil Lunde (born 25 February 1963) is an American voice actor for ADV Films.

Anime
 Battle Angel – Dr. Daisuke Ito
 Blue Seed – Gang member A, Teacher, Yamatone
 Burn Up W – Cartel boss
 Dark Warrior – Chat show host, Narrator, and a few unlisted roles
 Dirty Pair Flash: Mission Two – Worlds World's chief of security
 Original Dirty Pair – "God", Grey Nea
 Ellicia – Ancient Evil, Guku
 Fire Emblem – Slave trader, and a few unlisted roles
 Gunsmith Cats – Detective Roy Coleman
 Kimera – Ginzu
 Master of Mosquiton – Mosquiton
 Neon Genesis Evangelion – Kouzou Fuyutsuki, movie actor, NERV Section 2 Agent
 New Cutie Honey – Peeping Spider
 Plastic Little – Nalderof Aldomordish
 Power Dolls – Yao's father
 Princess Minerva – Wisler
 Slayers: The Motion Picture – Juliano Jubibieno
 Slayers: The Book of Spells – Galda
 Sorcerer Hunters – Zaha Torte (1st voice)
 Street Fighter II V – Guard at gate, Hector
 Those Who Hunt Elves – Chef, townsman, villager

References

1963 births
Living people
American male voice actors